Khalilabad (also Romanized as Khalīlābād) is a village in Mahan Rural District, Mahan District, Kerman County, Kerman Province, Iran. At the 2006 census, its population was 16, in 4 families.

References 

Populated places in Kerman County